Miaoli is a railway station in Miaoli County, Taiwan served by Taiwan Railways.

Overview
The station has one side platform and one island platform. It also has a tourist information center. Miaoli Station is an important station on the Taichung line and has facilities for freight/cargo services.

History
1930: The station is reconstructed as a brick building.
21 April 1935: After the 1935 Shinchiku-Taichū earthquake, the station was rebuilt.
24 April 1935: The station train depot is reconstructed.
1943: The station was destroyed by bombing during the Pacific War.
August 1955: Due to increased traffic at the station, platform 1 was reconstructed, the elevated walkway was demolished, and a new tunnel was constructed.
November 1975: The third-generation station was reconstructed using reinforced concrete as a two-story station.
1978: The second story and the station entrance are reconstructed to include a clock.
1997: Due to the construction for double-tracking of the Mountain line, the station is once again reconstructed including the entrance, the platforms, and expansion of the station.
11 October 1998: After the completion of the double-tracking project, the station becomes a stop.
10 June 1999: The TRA Railroad Museum opens for service.
1 November 2006: The Fu-an Underground Passage opens for use.
25 June 2008: The Taroko Express begins servicing the station.
16 June 2009: The station becomes an origin point for the Tzu-Chiang Limited Express.
29 October 2010: The construction for a cross-platform station design begins.
22 December 2010: As part of the 100th anniversary celebrations of the Republic of China, the TRA begins running a Miaoli to  service (via the South-link line).

Platform layout

Passenger service

Freight service

Around the station
 Miaoli County Government
 Miaoli County Urban Planning Exhibition Center
 Miaoli Railway Museum
 National United University
 Carrefour Miaoli Branch
 Fengnian St. Night Market
 Cultural Center Night Market
 Station Front Market
 Miaoli Yiming Temple
 Zhongshan Rd. Old Street
 Zhongzheng Rd. Old Street
 Miaoli County Public Library
 Miaoli County Government International Culture Center

See also
 List of railway stations in Taiwan

References

External links

Miaoli Station 
Miaoli Station

1903 establishments in Taiwan
Miaoli City
Railway stations served by Taiwan Railways Administration
Railway stations in Miaoli County
Railway stations opened in 1903